Evija Šulce (born 2 September 1970) is a Latvian luger. She competed at the 1992 Winter Olympics and the 1994 Winter Olympics. Her brother is Aivis Švāns.

References

External links
 
 
 

1970 births
Living people
Latvian female lugers
Olympic lugers of Latvia
Lugers at the 1992 Winter Olympics
Lugers at the 1994 Winter Olympics
Sportspeople from Riga